Nicolas Thys (born 27 August 1968) is a Belgian bassist.  He graduated in 1994 from the Hilversum Conservatory (in the Netherlands), where he also taught bass and double bass. Thys took private lessons with Dave Holland, Marc Helias and Marc Johnson. He received several awards, most notably the Golden Django award for best young talent in 2001. Thys performed live with Toots Thielemans, Garrett List, Judy Niemack, Mark Turner, Jeanfrançois Prins, Ivan Paduart, Kris Defoort, Kenny Werner, and Mike Stern. He released his first CD with his band Alice's 5 Moons in 1997.

Bands
He recorded with:
 K.D.'s Decade
 Félix Simtaine
 Tomas & Co
 Brussels Jazz Orchestra
 Bart Defoort Quartet
 Kris Defoort Quartet
 Octurn
 Jason Seizer
 Bill Carrothers

References
 Jazz in Belgium website

1968 births
Living people
Belgian jazz musicians
Belgian bass guitarists
Belgian double-bassists
Male double-bassists
21st-century double-bassists
21st-century male musicians
Male jazz musicians
Octurn members
Kris Defoort Quartet members
Pirouet Records artists